Dominique Davray (born Marie-Louise Gournay; 27 January 1919 in Paris – 16 August 1998 in Paris) was a French actress. She performed in more than ninety films from 1942 to 1983.

Filmography

External links 
 

20th-century French actresses
1919 births
1998 deaths
French film actresses
Actresses from Paris